The Nevada Wolf Pack women's basketball program is a college basketball team that represents the University of Nevada, Reno. The team is currently a member of the Mountain West Conference, which is a Division I conference in the National Collegiate Athletic Association (NCAA).

History
Though the Wolf Pack began play in 1899, record were not accurately kept up to date until the 1981–82 season, considered by the school to be the first for the program. They played in the West Coast Athletic Conference from 1985 to 1987, the Mountain West from 1987–88, the Big Sky Conference from 1988–1992, the Big West Conference from 1992–2000, and the Western Athletic Conference from 2000–2012 before joining the Mountain West Conference in 2012. they made the WNIT in 2007 and 2011, winning their First Round game in the latter year against St. Mary's 65–62 but losing in the Second Round to USC 78–59. As of the end of the 2015–16 season, they have a 363–583 all-time record.

References

External links